Guillermo Heredia Molina Jr. (born January 31, 1991) is a Cuban professional baseball outfielder for the SSG Landers of the Korea Baseball Organization (KBO). He made his MLB debut in 2016. He previously played for the Seattle Mariners, Tampa Bay Rays, Pittsburgh Pirates, New York Mets and Atlanta Braves. He bats right-handed and throws left-handed.

Professional career
Heredia played for the Cuba national baseball team at the 2013 World Baseball Classic. He played for Matanzas in the Cuban National Series since 2009. He defected from Cuba in January 2015, to pursue a contract with a Major League Baseball team.

Seattle Mariners

On February 23, 2016, the Seattle Mariners signed Heredia to a one-year major league contract for $500,000. He made his major league debut on July 29, 2016. He spent most of his time on the Mariners in 2016 as a late-innings defensive replacement. He played in the Arizona Fall League to work on making his swing more compact before the start of the 2017 season.

Tampa Bay Rays
On November 8, 2018, Heredia was traded, along with Mike Zunino and Michael Plassmeyer, to the Tampa Bay Rays for Mallex Smith and Jake Fraley. In his first season with the Rays, he hit .225 in 89 games. On December 2, 2019, Heredia was non-tendered by Tampa Bay and became a free agent.

Pittsburgh Pirates
On January 9, 2020, Heredia signed a one-year deal with the Pittsburgh Pirates. On August 24, 2020, Heredia was designated for assignment by the Pirates after only playing in 8 games on the year.

New York Mets
On August 28, 2020, Heredia was claimed by the New York Mets on waivers.

On September 22, 2020, Heredia hit a solo home run to center field off of Tampa Bay Rays reliever John Curtiss for his first hit as a member of the Mets.

Heredia was designated for assignment on February 21, 2021 after the Mets signed outfielder Kevin Pillar.

Atlanta Braves
On February 24, 2021, Heredia was claimed off waivers by the Atlanta Braves. On April 18, Heredia hit two home runs, one a grand slam, to become the first Braves player to record 6+ RBIs in a game from the No. 8 spot in the lineup since the RBI became an official stat in 1920.

In 2021 he batted .220/.311/.354 with 5 home runs and 26 RBIs. On November 30, 2021, the Braves signed Heredia to a one-year, $1 million contract.

On November 18, Heredia was non tendered and became a free agent.

SSG Landers
On December 11, 2022, Heredia signed with the SSG Landers of the Korea Baseball Organization.

References

External links

1991 births
Living people
Sportspeople from Matanzas
Major League Baseball players from Cuba
Cuban expatriate baseball players in the United States
Defecting Cuban baseball players
Major League Baseball outfielders
2013 World Baseball Classic players
Seattle Mariners players
Tampa Bay Rays players
Pittsburgh Pirates players
New York Mets players
Atlanta Braves players
Jackson Generals (Southern League) players
Tacoma Rainiers players
Peoria Javelinas players
Águilas Cibaeñas players
Durham Bulls players
Gwinnett Stripers players